Qicheng Road is a metro station on Line 7 of the Hangzhou Metro in China. Opened on 30 December 2020, it is located in the Qiantang District of Hangzhou.

References 

Hangzhou Metro stations
2020 establishments in China